Earl Wilson (April 18, 1906 – April 27, 1990) was an American educator and politician who served 11 terms as a United States representative from Indiana during the mid-20th century.

Biography 
He was born on a farm near Huron, Indiana and attended public schools there. He attended Purdue University and received degrees from Coyne Electrical School of Chicago, Illinois in 1928 and Indiana University of Bloomington, Indiana in 1931. He taught high school in Dubois, White, and Decautur Counties between 1931 and 1938 and as a high school principal in Jackson County 1939–1940.

Political career 
Wilson decided to enter politics and in 1940 he narrowly defeated New Deal Democrat incumbent Eugene B. Crowe 71,624–69,227 and was elected as the Republican Representative for Indiana's 9th congressional district. He served in the United States Congress until 1958, when he was defeated by Earl Hogan for reelection. In 1960, he defeated Hogan and was returned to Congress in 1961.  Wilson won reelection in 1962.]. In 1964 Wilson was defeated for reelection by Democrat Lee Hamilton 74,939 – 62,780. Wilson did not vote in favor of the Civil Rights Acts of 1957 and 1964, despite voting in favor of the Civil Rights Act of 1964 in the first House vote on February 10, 1964. However, he voted present on the 24th Amendment to the U.S. Constitution.

While in Congress, Wilson was influential in moving Samuel Woodfill's body from Madison, Indiana to Arlington National Cemetery.

Later career and death 
After his loss to Hamilton in 1964 Wilson was elected to the Indiana State Senator serving there from 1969 to 1976. He was a resident of Bedford, Indiana, until his death on April 27, 1990.

References

 

1906 births
1990 deaths
Indiana University alumni
Republican Party Indiana state senators
People from Bedford, Indiana
20th-century American politicians
Republican Party members of the United States House of Representatives from Indiana